Pirates was a Lego theme launched in 1989 featuring pirates, soldiers from the Napoleonic Wars, Pacific Islanders, sailing ships, and buried treasure, being influenced by the late Golden Age of Piracy. The theme has been seen in Lego System (minifigure scale, typically age 6–12), Duplo and the 4+ theme.

History
Created by a small team led by designer Niels Milan Pedersen, Lego Pirates was the company's fourth theme (after Space, Castle, Town) and it was more complex. Numerous new pieces were also created including firearms, wildlife (parrots, sharks, monkeys), and cloth sails. Lego Pirates minifigures were the first to go beyond the traditional head with simply two dots for eyes and a smile, as many of them had a variety of different printed features including eyepatches, facial hair, and feminine makeup. Only a few minifigures in Lego Pirates used the traditional face of two eyes and a smile; the soldier/trooper of the Imperial Soldiers and Imperial Guards, the Imperial Soldiers sailor/marine (only found in 6274 Caribbean Clipper), and young pirate Bo'Sun Will. Prior to the launch of Lego Pirates, minifigures were distinguished in function and organization by their torso, headgear (either a helmet or hair), and accessories, being generic roles without any specified character.

In Lego's first attempt to establish a narrative and encourage role-playing, personalities were created for several of these minifigures of Lego Pirates. Stories were printed on boxes, particularly for the USA market where the larger sets had a flap that opened up to display the contents. In a first for Lego television ads used stop-motion animation. A comic book entitled "The Gold Medallion" was also released in that year, as well as a Ladybird Book series. The storyline takes place in the 18th century, where pirates had been searching for buried treasure as the doubloons (Spanish gold coins) belonged to their ancestors, however a colony of settlers discovered the treasure first and claimed it, leading to conflict. The Governor of the colony was forced to fortify the settlements and attempted to hide the treasure in his main fortress.

The Pirates were led by Captain Redbeard (called Captain Roger in some markets), distinguished by his black bicorne hat, left eye patch, peg leg on the right and a hook where his left hand was; his crew included First Mate Rummy and the young Bo'Sun Will. Another pirate leader was Captain Ironhook who has been suggested as a rival to Redbeard; both minifigures were similar except that Ironhook had a tattered shirt (some releases of Ironhook have a peg leg). Their emblem was the Jolly Roger, a black flag featuring the skull and crossbones. 6285 Black Seas Barracuda was their first pirate ship while 6270 Forbidden Island was their original hideout, both released in 1989. The catalogue releases for the Pirates expanded considerably with a larger base, 6273 Rock Island Refuge (1991), and then a pair of pirate ships in 1993 (the large 6286 Skull's Eye Schooner and small 6268 Renegade Runner).

Opposing the Pirates were the Imperial Soldiers led by Governor Broadside and his second-in-command Lieutenant de Martinet. These blue-coated forces were based upon the French navy and marines of the colonial era and Napoleonic Wars, being known Imperial Soldiers in certain catalogues worldwide, though explicitly identified as "Governors" on page 16 of the 1990 American catalog. From 1992 to 1993, the Imperial Soldiers were gradually replaced by the red-coated Imperial Guards led by Admiral Woodside (with 6274 Caribbean Clipper and 6276 Eldorado Fortress being replaced by 6271 Imperial Flagship and 6277 Imperial Trading Post, respectively, as the Imperials' sailing ship and main base). The smaller Imperial Soldiers sets that continued on sale until the end of 1993 were considered part of the Guards, in part as placeholders since only two more catalogue sets were released for the Guards after 1992. The Soldiers and Guards minifigures were very similar save for a Palette swap of uniforms and facial expressions. Both the Imperial Soldiers and the Imperial Guards used two crossed cannons under a crown as their emblem, though the Soldiers' blue flag was similar to the Flag of Quebec while the Guards had three thick red horizontal stripes. The Imperial Guards were reintroduced in 2009–10, and the Imperial Soldiers were reintroduced in 2015; the Guards and Soldiers were the respective government opponents of the Pirates during the brief periods of Lego Pirates revival.

A new faction loosely based on a Polynesian concept, the Islanders, was released for 1994. This resulted in Lego having three factions in 1994 and 1995, with the Pirates battling the Imperial Guard on the high seas and disturbing the Islanders while seeking treasure. However, in 1995 Lego discontinued all of the previously released Imperial Guards sets from 1992 to 1993 (particularly their larger sets, the 6271 Imperial Flagship and 6277 Imperial Trading Post), making the new release 6263 Imperial Outpost the sole Imperial Guards set, which essentially made the year a Pirates versus Islanders conflict.

For 1996 Lego changed the entire "feel" of the Pirates line, giving the Pirates minifigs new faces, and made it Spanish-influenced. The Imperial Guards were replaced by the Imperial Armada (heavily influenced by the Spanish Armada), though the Guards' 6263 Imperial Outpost remained available in 1996 as a medium land base for Imperial side, as ending up only two sets were released for the Armada including the 6280 Armada Flagship (although Armada minifigures were guests in new sets of the Pirates faction). 1996 was also the last year for the Islanders who had not seen any new releases since 1994 nor had their minifigures featured as guests in other factions' sets. 1997 featured just the Pirates versus the Imperial Armada; however some of the new releases like 6250 Cross Bone Clipper and 6281 Pirates Perilous Pitfalls were not well received and this turned out to be the final year of the original Lego Pirates run.

After 1997, Lego discontinued the Pirates theme to the shock of fans, because the Pirates line had always been a big seller. The original releases (1989–91) retrospectively were most nostalgic among Lego Pirates fans due to the sets' design and meticulous detail, which was sacrificed in subsequent releases for increased playability, which drew a mixed reception. For instance the 6286 Skull's Eye Schooner (1993), which succeeded 6285 Black Seas Barracuda (1989) as the main Pirates ship set, implemented a mechanism for the ship's wheel to control the rudder which necessitated a smaller and less detailed aft cabin, plus the Skull's Eye Schooner's cannons are attached to rotating turntables on sliders instead of the more realistic placement of cannons upon wheeled naval carriages like earlier Lego Pirates ship sets. 6289 Red Beard Runner (1996), which replaced 6286, drew criticism for "battle damage" features like the tumbling forward mast and collapsing quarterdeck as these made the assembled set unstable. The changes to Lego's set design direction, not just in Lego Pirates but also across their other product lines, have been attributed to the Lego Group's retiring of many LEGO Designers who had created the sets from the late 1970s to the early 1990s, replacing them with 30 'innovators' who graduated from the European design colleges around Europe who knew "little specifically about toy design and less about LEGO building".

The Pirates theme was brought to 4+ for 2004 and Duplo for 2006.

Lego reintroduced Pirates and Imperial Guards in minifigure scale for 2009, including the pirate ship 6243 Brickbeard's Bounty, just in time for the theme's 20th anniversary. 6243 Brickbeard's Bounty uses identical bow pieces for the front and rear of the ship's hull, in contrast to earlier Lego Pirates ships which each had unique bow and stern hull pieces. However, there was only one more set released the following year, the 10210 Imperial Flagship (2010) which was the largest vessel in Lego Pirates ever released. After 2010, the revived Lego Pirates theme was discontinued in order to make room for a series of licensed products, Lego Pirates of the Caribbean, based on the film series of the same name.

In 2015, Lego again briefly reintroduced the theme with Pirates and Imperial Soldiers, including the pirate ship 70413 The Brick Bounty (inspired by the earlier 6243 Brickbeard's Bounty and 6285 Black Seas Barracuda). The 70413 The Brick Bounty has a rear cabin built directly onto the rearmost hull piece which is a middle hull piece section (there is no longer unique stern hull piece).

2020 saw the release of the 30th Lego Ideas set 21322 Pirates of Barracuda Bay, which can be built either as a pirate shipwreck on an island or the pirate ship (inspired by 6285 Black Seas Barracuda) due to its modular design.

Set list
Two 1996 Pirate sets, "Red Beard Runner" and "Armada Flagship", and one 1994 Islanders set, "Enchanted Island", were re-released for 2001.

6276 Eldorado Fortress remains a classic for its design and innovation. Being considered the benchmark for Lego pirate ships, the 6285 Black Seas Barracuda (1989) was re-released as 10040 Black Seas Barracuda (2002) as part of the Lego Legends series. The Black Seas Barracuda was also the inspiration for the 30th Lego Ideas set 21322 Pirates of Barracuda Bay, released in 2020, which can be built either as a pirate shipwreck on an island or the pirate ship due to its modular design.

The 10210 Imperial Flagship (2010) of the Imperial Guards faction is the largest ship in Lego Pirates ever released, exceeding that of the 6286 Skull's Eye Schooner (1993). This ended a long running gag in Lego Pirates where the previous three Imperials' flagships were smaller than contemporary pirate ships; traditionally the pirate ship was also the largest and most expensive set of its era in Lego Pirates.

Set names from UK, Australia & New Zealand given in brackets.

Pirates (1989–1997, 2001–2002)
 1989

 1990

 1991

 1992

 1993

 1994

 1995

 1996

 1997

 2001–2002

Pirates (2009–2010)

Pirates (2015)

Juniors Pirates (2015)

Imperial Soldiers (1989–1993)

Imperial Guards (1992–1995)

Imperial Armada (1996–1997, 2001)

Islanders (1994, 2001)

Official merchandise

Lego Group has also released a variety of official Pirate Lego merchandise ranging from clothing to stick-on tattoos to board games.

Characters

Pirates

Captain Redbeard and his crew 
Captain Roger Redbeard
Captain Roger Redbeard, basically known as Captain Redbeard or Captain Roger, is a fictional character created by the Lego Company for the Pirates theme of the Lego System. The Pirate theme, along with the captain,  was first introduced in 1989. As the theme's main antagonist, the leader of the pirates fights continuously against Governor Broadside's soldiers. Captain Redbeard is in command of five pirate ships: Black Sea Barracuda (1989), Skull's Eye Schooner (1993), Red Beard Runner (1996), Crossbone Clipper (1997) and The Brick Bounty (2015). During the years of fighting, he suffered three major injuries, which caused him to wear an eye patch over his left eye, an iron hook where his left hand used to be and a wooden right leg. Additional trademarks of the captain are the skull and crossed bones on his bicorne, his distinctive gold-trimmed black frock coat and green jabot, and a colorful tropical parrot named Popsy. Together with his friend Bo'sun Will and his first mate Rummy, Captain Redbeard encounters countless adventures of swash-buckling, sailing, treasure hunting and piracy. He has 3 children: Pirate Princess Argenta, Ms. Dagger and son Nobeard, who was banished because he couldn't grow beard. His wife could be Anne, but it was never officially confirmed.

Despite the introduction of Captain Brickbeard in Lego's newest 2009 line-up of pirate-themed sets, many people still feel that the original pirate commander, Captain Redbeard, is unquestionably THE Lego pirate captain. The fan website www.classic-pirates.com calls Captain Redbeard "the true king of the Lego Pirates line", and "he will always remain the main icon of the Lego Pirates line". Others feel that Brickbeard is just a new release of Roger/Redbeard, due to the close resemblance between the two figures.

 First Mate Rummy
Identified as Captain Redbeard's first mate. He is a good sailor, but not a very good pirate and singer. He is unsurprisingly quite fond of drinking rum and it can distract him from his work. In pirate comic, he was told by Captain Redbeard's cabin boy Jimbo that Flashfork (ship's cook) asked why are they loading 20 barrels of rum and only 2 barrels of water. Rummy replied that one barrel of water is quite enough.

Bo'Sun Will Cavendish
Will was Captain Redbeard's Boatswain on Black Seas' Barracuda and more or less his adopted son. He is one of the youngest crew members of Black Seas' Barracuda. Will's father asked Captain Redbeard to raise and take care of Will as he was going to be executed. During a battle between pirates and Imperial Soldiers, Will saved governor Broadside's niece Camilla and fell in love with her. She then often helped pirates by giving them various pieces of information.

 Jimbo
Jimbo is Captain Redbeard's cabin boy on Black Seas' Barracuda. He was originally a stowaway.

 Flashfork the cook
Flashfork was captain Redbeard's cook on Black Seas' Barracuda. He isn't very fond of Will and Jimbo. He never appeared as a minifigure as he has unique shirt, red with blue stripes. The closest minifigure to look like him was Darwin the Pirate.

 Anne
Lady Anne Anchor, simply known as Anne, is daughter of Bessie, the owner of the best tavern on the Forbidden Island. She was part of the crew on Black Seas' Barracuda and later on Skull's Eye Schooner. She could even be Captain Redbeard's wife as they can be seen together quite often and according to her description from Pirates of Barracuda Bay set, she's Redbeard's right hand.

 Darwin the Pirate
Darwin is one of the pirates on Black Seas' Barracuda. He is a very clumsy pirate and sailor.

 Redbeard Runner's crew
Redbeard Runner's crew consists of: Black Jack Hawkins, George, Jake the Snake Blake, Gonzo Goldbar, Parma Sean LaFeet and Tattoo McGoo. Each one of them has some curiosities. Black Jack Hawkins is a prominent member and he's very competitive, George is very good friend to Parma Sean LaFeet and he once wore a black bicorne and a peg-leg, Jake the Snake Blake is very similar to Captain Ironhook and he owns a pet crocodile, Gonzo Goldbar can be seen helping Captain Ironhook and resisting Imperial Guards quite often, Parma Sean LaFeet is a very good friend to George and Tattoo McGoo is very similar to LaFeet.

Brickbeard's Bounty's Crew 
Captain Brickbeard
Captain Brickbeard is a fictional character created by the Lego Company for their 2009-line of Pirates sets; he is an updated version of the Redbeard character. He really likes gold. That can be seen on his gold-decorated coat, his gold hook and his gold-decorated ship. Unlike Redbeard, he is in command of only one ship, The Brickbeard's Bounty. He and his crew are very good friends of islanders and King Kahuka. He also has a girlfriend, Lady Pirate.

Of all the Lego Pirate Captains, none of them are female. Only Lego fans have made female pirate captains.

 Lady Pirate
Lady Pirate is a crew member on Brickbeard's Bounty. She doesn't have any special title, but she is somehow very special to Brickbeard as she is his girlfriend.

 Scarlett the Buccaneer
Scarlett is known as a tough buccaneer among pirates and Imperials. She spends much time in an inn and she is very fond of arm-wrestling.

 Hank the Castaway
Hank is guarding a treasure on Loot Island together with another pirate. There are many stories about him. Some even say he has rats under his bandana.

Renegade Runner's crew 
Captain Ironhook 
Starting with a 1992 set, there appeared a minifigure quite similar to Captain Redbeard but more intimidating, the main difference being the torso with a shredded red shirt and sporting a massive knife slung through his belt. Although initially regarded as another depiction of Captain Roger/Redbeard, he is regarded as a separate character named "Captain Ironhook" on the Classic Pirates website. Ironhook commands the masted raft 6261 Raft Raiders (also known as 6261 Ironhook's Escape Craft) (1992) and the small pirate ship 6268 Renegade Runner (1993). Late minifigures of Ironhook have a peg leg like Redbeard.  While they are nominally on the same side when facing the Imperial Guard , the two pirate captains are not on friendly terms especially if treasure is being disputed.

 Lolbroek
Lolbroek is one of Ironhook's pirates. He saved himself with the raft from a shark which was about to bite his leg off. As the shark bit into the raft, it broke a tooth.

Imperials

Imperial Soldiers 
Governor Broadside
Governor Broadside is Captain Redbeard's main enemy and (mostly) main victim as well, as Redbeard seems to always get the better of him. In the 2015 Pirates Line, Broadside was replaced by Governor Hacienda. Broadside lives in his Eldorado Fortress with his sister Prudence and his niece Camilla, although they were never portrayed in any sets. Broadside is depicted as corrupted and lazy person, who only likes to eat, collect taxes and execute citizens of Port Royal.

 Governor Hacienda
Governor Hacienda is Governor Broadside's replacement in 2015 Pirates reboot. He really likes collecting taxes and gems. It is therefore not surprising that when pirates steal his treasure he becomes very very angry.

 Admiral Nonsuch
Admiral Nonsuch is the bluecoats' officer with the highest rank. He is the leader of the bluecoats' Black Ribbon Fleet and is subordinate to Governor Hacienda. Being the officer with the highest rank makes him a very important man, especially in his own eyes.

Lieutenant de Martinet
Lt. Jean de Martinet is identified on the website Classic Pirates as Governor Broadside's second-in-command. He is a much more capable soldier and leader than Broadside himself. He is also much more cruel and hopes to one day become governor himself, although he should therefore oppose Broadside. He even says the governor's men would rather choose death than surrender. This otherwise sounds very brave, although in Pirate Comic he then remarks that they are still too young to die.

Imperial Guards 
Admiral Woodhouse
Adm. Woodhouse is identified as the leader of the red-coated Imperial Guards. He is often confused with Governor Broadside, as in the USA he was the same character as him after all. In 2009, he was replaced by Governor Tierney. Woodhouse is very similar to Governor Broadside as the main difference between them are colors of their clothing. Woodhouse also wears gloves and he resents Broadside. He pilots ship called HMS Sea Lion (Imperial Flagship).

 Governor Tierney
Governor Tierney is the leader of the redcoats and captain of the new Imperial Flagship in the new pirates' line from 2009 to 2010. He is the main rival of Captain Brickbeard. He was a very good friend of Captain Redbeard's son Nobeard, but due to their jobs, they had to end the friendship. He also has a daughter, Leigh Tierney and she is not to be confused with Miss Miranda Valentina, the admiral's daughter.

Islanders 
King Kahuka
Kahuka is the leader of the Islanders, a Polynesian-based sub-theme of the Pirates theme and he cannot be mistaken for anyone else that Lego has ever conjured up. He wears a massive, carved red face mask topped with white feathers, a face painted white and blue, a necklace made out of teeth and a large round medallion, a red sash around his waist (which was probably a present given to him by a passing ship's captain) and a grass skirt. His center of power is located on "Enchanted Island", a fictitious island invented by Lego.

Ladybird Books series
An official series of children's books based on the Pirate Lego theme was published by Ladybird Books in 1990.

Titles
 Will and the Gold Chase
 Captain Roger's Birthday
 Adventure on Shark Island
 The Royal Visit

The stories revolved around the misadventures of the crew of Dark Shark and their run-ins with Broadside's Imperial Soldiers. The stories developed a stronger characterisation for key characters and expanded the Pirate Lego universe. Captain Foul, who made his debut in Pirate Comic, also appeared in this series. He commanded the ship “The Barracuda”, however the captain did not appear in any of the official Pirate Lego sets.

Like in the comic, Governor Broadside appeared with his sister Prudence and niece Camilla once again. The Dark Shark's (Black Seas' Barracuda's) crew's names were also used once again.

A short biographical description and illustrated portrait of each of the Dark Shark's characters was presented on the first and second pages of each book.

Characters
Broadside's Family
Aunt Prudence
Camilla
Governor Broadside

Dark Shark Crew
Anne
Bo'Sun Will
Captain Roger (known as Captain Redbeard in Northern America)
Flashfork
First Mate Rummy
Jimbo
Popsy (the parrot)
Spinoza (the monkey)

On the final two pages of each book is a map of the fictional archipelago named “The Treasure Islands” in which the Ladybird Pirate Lego universe is set.

Islands
Black Reef Island
Emerald Island
Hook Nose Island
Island of Fogs
Island of Ruins
Island of Skulls
John Silver Island
Pirate Hat Island
Pirate's Nest
Sabatina
Shark Island
Skeleton Island

1993 World Lego Expo – Pirates Ahoy 
For its 1993 World Expo, the Lego Group chose “Pirates Ahoy” as the theme. The exhibition contained various exhibits mostly depicting three-dimensional sculptures of pirates made entirely from Lego, although the Pirate Galleon containing 13,280 pieces was built at System minifigure scale and was crewed by standard Pirate Lego minifigures.

Souvenir guide 
A souvenir guide accompanied the exhibition and its main feature was a story which loosely tied the exhibits together in a first-person narrative.   The souvenir guide also provided information about each exhibit including its name, how many pieces it contained and the number of hours it took to construct.

The top-left corner of odd pages contained information and an illustrated portrait of infamous pirates from history including Blackbeard and Bartholomew Roberts, while the top-right hand corners of the even pages included a picture of that pirate's flag.

Exhibits

Theme park attraction
In 1999, a Lego Pirates-themed land was introduced to Legoland California, based on the Lego Pirates toy theme. The area featuring Pirate Shores is a splash park with water-oriented rides and attractions. This area was added in 2006, and Captain Cranky's Challenge was added in May 2007. Also included Pirate Reef, Soak n' Sail, Splash Battle and Swabbie's Deck.

In 2002, a Lego Pirates-themed land was introduced to Legoland Deutschland Resort, based on the Lego Pirates toy theme. The area features Captain Nick's Splash Battle, Pirates School and Pirates’ Playground.

In 2011, a Lego Pirates-themed land was introduced to Legoland Florida, based on the Lego Pirates toy theme. The area featured Pirates' Cove and also included The Battle For Brickbeard's Bounty.

In 2021, a Lego Pirates-themed land was introduced to Legoland New York, based on the Lego Pirates toy theme. The area features Anchors Away, Rogue Riders and Splash Battle.

In 2022, a Lego Pirates-themed land was introduced to Legoland Discovery Centre in Birmingham and Manchester, based on the Lego Pirates toy theme. Legoland Florida also included Pirate River Quest, a new pirate-themed ride.

See also
Lego Pirates of the Caribbean
Lego Brawls

References

External links 
Official 2009 Lego site
Classic-Pirates.com  LEGO Pirate forum and information resource.
Fibblesnork's Lego Guide: Pirates
Brickset: List of all Lego Pirate sets
Lugnet: List of all Lego Pirate sets

Pirates
Piracy in fiction
Products introduced in 1989
Products and services discontinued in 2015